Tamara Natanovna Eidelman is a Russian historian, Honored Teacher of the Russian Federation, translator, blogger and an editor for Russian Life.

Early life

Career 
Eidelman has been teaching since 1981 and is the head of the History Department in Moscow School #1567. From 1986 to 2021, she worked at school No. 67 in Moscow as a teacher of history and social studies, later as head of the department of history.

She is author and editor of Mozaika kultur (Rus. Мозаика культур "Mosaics of Cultures") study guide. 

She has authored articles on teaching issues published in Russian Journal, Euroclio Bulletin, School Review; presented TEDx talks. She hosted thematic programs “Books of Our Childhood”, “The Subjunctive Mood” and “The Fates of Books” on the radio stations Mayak, Voice of Russia and Radio Russia-Culture.

She is also the author and lecturer of a series of lectures on history and social science at the  School and the lecturer of a series of children's audio courses on history for Radio Arzamas. Lecturer of a series of lectures on the history of Russia at the beginning of the 19th century on the InternetUrok.ru platform.

She blogging on the Echo of Moscow website between 2012-2022 and since 2020, she was a columnist for the online edition of The Insider.

In October 2019, she created the “History Lessons with Tamara Eidelman” channel on YouTube, where she discusses various historical topics. As of March 2022, the video blog had more than 500 thousand subscribers, and the total video views have reached 35 million. She has a YouTube channel on world history in Russian. 

In April 2021, she presented the author's cycle "Against the Current: A History of Civil Conflicts" at the Yeltsin Center. The cycle was dedicated to the peaceful struggle of people for their rights, including the bloodless change of totalitarian power in a number of European countries in the 20th century.

She helped with the translation of the Russian edition of The Wolf of Wall Street by Jordan Belfort and is the author of the book How Propaganda Works (Russian: Как работает Пропаганда).

Political views and activism
In 2014, she criticised Russian politicians for their military intervention in Ukraine. On April 9 she said that she would like to teach patriotism in her classes but only if she can do it her way, referring to mass deportation of Crimean Tatars in World War II which according to her is still not a part of curriculum. On March 2, 2014, she and her daughter took part in an anti-war picket in front of the Ministry of Defence in Moscow. They were detained and brought to Meshchanskoe police station with more than 15 other protesters, where they were held for longer than the legally permitted three hours. Later she told journalists, that she and her daughter escaped through the window.

On August 31, 2014, she criticized Russian President Vladimir Putin for disregarding the rule of law.

In April 2021, Eidelman wrote an open letter asking the Moscow office of Doctors Without Borders to help politician Alexei Navalny, then imprisoned in a penal colony in Pokrov. The letter was signed by approximately two thousand people. 

On April 26, 2021, Eidelman was called to the police, as stated, 'to draw up a report on the violation of the order of holding a meeting'. The call to the police was allegedly connected with a rally in support of Alexei Navalny on 21 April, but Eidelman was not related to the organizers.

In 2022, she condemned the 2022 Russian invasion of Ukraine, and left the country.

Personal life 
As of 2022, she lived in Germany.

References

External links
Blog of Tamara Eidelman on Echo of Moscow website 
Tamara Eidelman's YouTube channel. World History topics presentations.
Тамара Эйдельман: «Вы дустом не пробовал  at openrussia.org
и?»  interview with Tamara Eidelman about education in modern Russia at openrussia.org

Living people
1959 births
20th-century births
Russian schoolteachers
Russian Jews
20th-century Russian historians
Russian bloggers
Russian YouTubers
Russian editors
Russian women editors
Russian translators
English–Russian translators
Russian women historians
Russian women bloggers
21st-century translators
Soviet schoolteachers
20th-century Russian women writers
Russian activists against the 2022 Russian invasion of Ukraine
Russian emigrants to Portugal
21st-century Russian historians
People listed in Russia as foreign agents
Jewish women writers